Le Matin Bleu (literally: "The blue morning") was a Swiss French language free daily newspaper, published by Edipresse in Lausanne between 2005 and 2009.

History
A tabloid-format newspaper, Le Matin Bleu was first published on 31 October 2005, and had a circulation of about 100,000.  It was launched in anticipation of 20 minutes, the French-language edition of 20 Minuten, starting 8 March 2006, both of which are also free daily newspapers.

The newspaper was distributed in the most-populated areas of Romandy. While it shared its name with the daily newspaper Le Matin, also published by Edipresse, it was edited independently.

On 24 September 2009, the newspaper ceased publication because of the merger of Edipresse and Tamedia, which was already publishing 20 minutes.

See also
 List of free daily newspapers
 List of newspapers in Switzerland

References

External links
 lematinbleu.ch (in French), the newspaper's official website

2005 establishments in Switzerland
2009 disestablishments in Switzerland
Defunct free daily newspapers
Defunct newspapers published in Switzerland
French-language newspapers published in Switzerland
Publications disestablished in 2009
Newspapers established in 2005
Mass media in Lausanne